Deadman Standing (also known as Hyde Park) is a 2018 independent Western feature film written, edited and directed by Nicholas Barton and produced by Derin Dopps, who also acted as 1st AD. It is based on the true story of the gunfight at Hyde Park, in an area of South Central Kansas, presently occupied by Newton, KS.

Plot
Told primarily via flashbacks, Rosie, a local brothel owner, meets a drifter, she proceeds to uncover her version of the events that transpired in Newton two years earlier.

Cast
 C. Thomas Howell as The Stranger
 Quinn Lord as James Riley
 Viva Bianca as Rosie
 Luke Arnold as Mike McCluskie
 Richard Riehle as Clarence Potts
 M. C. Gainey as Hugh Anderson
 Danny Winn as  Happy Jim
 Monique Candelaria as Lyla
 Aly Mang as Violet
 Luce Rains as Faro Fred
 Christopher Hagen as Heyoke Joe
 Douglas Bennett as Hugh Anderson Jr.

Production
Hyde Park was filmed in 24 days in Santa Fe, NM and features a cast and crew of over 100.

The film was shot in 5K resolution using the RED Dragon Cameras.  The film was later downscaled to a 4k - 4096x2048 resolution for final delivery.

Post-production was completed at Barton's home studio in the Dallas/Fort Worth Metro.

Release
Hyde Park was released on December 11, 2018, by Lionsgate Entertainment, who changed the name of the film to Deadman Standing. It is available on all streaming platforms, with physical copies available at big box stores, on Amazon, and brought Red Box.

References

External links
 
 

2018 films
2018 Western (genre) films
2010s biographical films
2010s thriller films
American Western (genre) films
American biographical films
American thriller films
Films set in the 19th century
Films shot in New Mexico
Western (genre) films based on actual events
2010s English-language films
2010s American films